Celiptera grisescens is a moth of the family Erebidae. It is found in Mexico (Veracruz).

References

Moths described in 1901
Celiptera